Zvenigorodskaya is a station of Saint Petersburg Metro, on Frunzensko–Primorskaya Line, between stations Sadovaya and Obvodny Kanal.

It was opened on December 20, 2008, as one of the first stations on the new Frunzensko–Primorskaya Line. It is connected with foot passages to the Pushkinskaya station, serving the Kirovsko–Vyborgskaya Line.  Upon the opening it was without an independent surface exit; all traffic had to go through Pushkinskaya.  Escalators and a surface lobby were added later.

Transport 
Buses: 225, 262, 290. Trolleybuses: 3, 8, 15, 17. Trams: 16.

Concourse 

Under the initial data from press-service of Saint Petersburg Metro, a concourse building should construct under the project of the architect Alexander Konstantinov. 
This project was described as a two-storeyed building with a portico harmoniously entered in an architectural ensemble of the former barracks of Semyonovsky regiment.

Concourse will be land, it will be located on the ground floor of specially constructed building, it will take places between houses No. 1 and No. 3 on Zvenigorodskaya street. 
It was originally planned to build a two-storeyed building which should remind appearance a building of barracks of Semyonovsky regiment. 
On the ground floor it was planned to place a concourse, and on the second - services of Saint Petersburg Metro. 
Now is under construction five-floor shopping mall under the project of "Adamant" company.

The place of the future pass to down escalator hall is now draped by photo wallpaper with a townscape.

Underground hall 
Zvenigorodskaya was designed as a deep column station, but due to a long construction break it was decided to replace a part of a complex of columns with a wall. 
This decision has allowed to prevent displacement of already established columns. 

The station original project was executed by Russian architect Alexander Konstantinov, but after opening it has been declared that authors of the project is the group of architects of Open Society "Lenmetrogiprotrans" led by N. V. Romashkin-Timanov: Н. V. Romashkin-Timanov, Ю. V. Eechko, D. A. Bojtsov, N. A. Vinogradova.

The subjects of decorating of underground part of station also are devoted the Semyonovsky regiment (which its barracks settled down around a station exit on a surface). The floor is built from green granite Rakhi Green (India) with colour inserts and a fringing from red granite Imperial Red (India). Walls are revetted by marble of Koelga, Kashin's granite mountain and dark green marble Indiana Green (India). The choice of the supplier and stone from India was made by the best expert in a natural stone Vladimir Shestakov.

At station mosaic panels from smalt with the image of the very first soldiers of Semyonovsky regiment serving at the time of reign of Peter the Great are established. They are executed in masterful Russian Academy of Arts, the author is artist Alexander Bystrov.

Station illumination is realised by fixtures at top of columns.

Switch 
Stations Zvenigorodskaya of Frunzensko-Primorskaya Line and Pushkinskaya of Kirovsko-Vyborgskaya Line are connected by a foot tunnel. 
It is the first switch foot tunnel in Saint Petersburg Metro, constructed after a long break. 
Previous switch was constructed 18 years before at metro station Sadovaya and opened in December 1991. 
At transition designing workings out new to this underground railway system have been used.

At station Zvenigorodskaya the central part of an average hall is separated from platforms by walls. 
Such design has allowed to raise it over level of a floor of station - on it two longitudinal ladders conduct. 
Upward, in transition conduct ladders which pass in three corridors, leaders in a small hall.

Tunneling it was spent simultaneously from this hall to both stations.
From a hall in I will shift Pushkinskaya there are two corridors which come to an end with ladders, its have replaced pylon and two passes near to it.

At building of transition two chandeliers shining from platform station Pushkinskaya ceiling has been removed. 
They are established in that hall in which conduct corridors of transitions.

Building history 
At station Zvenigorodskaya worked some the building organisations:

 Tunnel group number 3. The chief engineer is Victor Tishkin (general construction);
 Construction management-19 (finishing work);
 "Adamant" company (concourse building).
Station building passed in three stages:

Projects 
In 1990 projects of stations (including Zvenigorodskaya) have been developed. There have been in rough passed tunnels for movement of trains. After that works have been curtailed, building has been preserved.

Station and switch 
Station and underground switch was built in 2007–08. 
In July 2007 at station the arches and walls separating the central hall from platforms were built.
In January 2008 the considerable quantity of problems has been solved:

 The continuous-columned complex is completely built.
 Dismantle time wagonhead vaults is almost finished.
 There is passed tunnel to station Pushkinkaya.
 At station Pushkinskaya the territory under ladder building is fenced off. Dismantle of umbrellas over the left station tunnel has been made.

On November 27, 2008, the mosaic panel was completely ready.
Dates of opening of station underground hallOriginally planned in June 2007 date of opening of station is December, 1st 2008. In July opening date has been appointed to December 18. In November 2008 management of Saint Petersburg Metro had been named new date of opening is on December, 24th 2008. As a result, on December 20, 2008 the station has been solemnly opened and its operation has begun.

From December 20 till March 7, 2009 movement of trains from station was carried out in a shuttle mode, before opening station Spasskaya and divisions of the Pravoberejnaya line.

Direct exit on a surface 

Direct exit on a surface was built from 2007. 
In July 2007 works on a construction of a lobby and an inclined course were begun:

In January 2008 there have been begun works in several directions:
 On a place of a land lobby of station it was spent a frozen chemical soil consolidation and a foundation ditch construction under the base of 3-4-floor buildings of a lobby.
 The building project Is confirmed.

In August 2009 work was finished on installation of all four escalators. After that installation of ferro-concrete designs of walls of the ground floor was begun. 
Over station 4 floors of shopping centre were to be constructed.
Dates of opening of a direct exit on a surfaceAs the first term in January 2008 has been named 2009. As of November it is planned to make it in July 2009.

References 

Saint Petersburg Metro stations
Shopping malls in Russia
Interchange stations of Saint Petersburg Metro
Railway stations in Russia opened in 2008
Railway stations located underground in Russia